Kress is a city in Swisher County, Texas, United States. The population was 715 at the 2010 census.

Geography

Kress is located at  (34.365010, –101.748129).

According to the United States Census Bureau, the city has a total area of 0.6 square miles (1.5 km2), all of it land.

Demographics

2020 census

As of the 2020 United States census, there were 596 people, 334 households, and 253 families residing in the city.

2000 census
As of the census of 2000, there were 826 people, 272 households, and 223 families residing in the city. The population density was 1,454.5 people per square mile (559.5/km2). There were 291 housing units at an average density of 512.4/sq mi (197.1/km2). The racial makeup of the city was 58.84% White, 3.27% African American, 0.36% Native American, 34.87% from other races, and 2.66% from two or more races. Hispanic or Latino of any race were 61.26% of the population.

There were 272 households, out of which 42.6% had children under the age of 18 living with them, 64.7% were married couples living together, 12.1% had a female householder with no husband present, and 18.0% were non-families. 17.3% of all households were made up of individuals, and 7.7% had someone living alone who was 65 years of age or older. The average household size was 3.04 and the average family size was 3.42.

In the city, the population was spread out, with 33.2% under the age of 18, 8.8% from 18 to 24, 24.2% from 25 to 44, 20.3% from 45 to 64, and 13.4% who were 65 years of age or older. The median age was 32 years. For every 100 females, there were 95.7 males. For every 100 females age 18 and over, there were 99.3 males.

The median income for a household in the city was $30,278, and the median income for a family was $31,618. Males had a median income of $22,000 versus $18,333 for females. The per capita income for the city was $12,305. About 15.1% of families and 17.5% of the population were below the poverty line, including 24.5% of those under age 18 and 11.1% of those age 65 or over.

Education
The City of Kress is served by the Kress Independent School District and home to the Kress High School Kangaroos.

Notable people

 Stella Garza-Hicks, Member of the Colorado House of Representatives

References

Cities in Texas
Cities in Swisher County, Texas